Kanab is a city in and the county seat of Kane County, Utah, United States. It is located on Kanab Creek just north of the Arizona state line. This area was first settled in 1864, and the town was founded in 1870 when ten Mormon families moved into the area. Named for a Paiute word meaning "place of the willows," Fort Kanab was built on the east bank of Kanab Creek in 1864 for defense against the Indians and as a base for the exploration of the area. The population was 4,312 at the 2010 census and an estimated 4,798 in 2018.

Kanab is situated in the "Grand Circle" area, centrally located among Vermilion Cliffs National Monument, Bryce Canyon National Park, the Grand Canyon (North Rim), Zion National Park, Pipe Spring National Monument, Monument Valley Navajo Tribal Park and Lake Powell. Other nearby attractions include Grand Staircase–Escalante National Monument, Coral Pink Sand Dunes State Park, the privately owned Moqui Cave, and the largest animal sanctuary in the United States, Best Friends Animal Society.

Locals refer to Kanab as "Little Hollywood" due to its history as a filming location for many movies and television series, prominently western, such as Stagecoach (1939), The Lone Ranger, Death Valley Days. Gunsmoke, Daniel Boone, El Dorado (1966), Planet of the Apes (1968), Mackenna's Gold, Sergeants 3, WindRunner: A Spirited Journey, Western Union (1941), The Desperadoes (1943), In Old Oklahoma (1943), Buffalo Bill (1944), Westward the Women (1952), Tomahawk Trail (1957), Fort Bowie (1958), Sergeants Three (1962), Duel at Diablo (1966), Ride in the Whirlwind (1965), The Shooting (1966), and The Outlaw Josey Wales (1976).

Geography and climate
Kanab is located on the western Colorado Plateau. U.S. Routes 89 and 89A meet in the center of town. US 89 leads north  to Orderville and southeast  to Page, Arizona, while US 89A leads south  to Fredonia, Arizona.

The city's downtown sits on flat ground to the east of Kanab Creek, which flows south to meet the Colorado River in the Grand Canyon.

Kanab has a borderline semi-arid climate (Köppen BSk), more typical of exposed regions around Arizona's Mogollon Rim. The town is rather wetter, especially during the winter months, and hotter than the typical Mountain West cool semi-arid climate. The dry spring season from April to June is warm to hot during the day and very clear but the hot sun and thin air typical of Utah mean that nights remain cool and frosts can occur even in May. In the summer, monsoon thunderstorms break up the dry weather between July and October. The winters are mild during the day and cold at night, but get more snow than most places in southern Utah. Snowfall varies a considerably from year to year, with some receiving almost none to  inches falling in 2001. On average, there will be 70.9 days that reach  and 7.6 that reach . Although Kanab is in hardiness zone of 7A with an average yearly low of just under , only 1.5 days fail to reach freezing on average.

Demographics

As of the census of 2010, there were 4,312 people, 1,729 households, and 1,130 families residing in the townships. The population density was 308 people per square mile (98.2/km2). There were 1,999 housing units at an average density of 141.8 per square mile (41.1/km2). The racial makeup of the town was 96.2% White, 0.3% African American, 1% Native American, 0.3% Asian, and 0.8% from other races, and 1.4% from two or more races. Hispanic or Latino of any race were 4.2% of the population.

There were 1,729 households, out of which 25.7% had children under the age of 18 living with them, a decrease of 6.4% compared to the 2000 census. 65.4% were married couples living together, 6.7% had a female householder with no husband present, and 34.6% were non-families, an increase of 7.9% over the 2000 census. 30.9% of all households were made up of individuals, and 13% had someone living alone who was 65 years of age or older. The average household size was 2.44 and the average family size was 3.08.

The median income for a household in the town was $42,286, and the median income for a family was $48,008. Males had a median income of $30,018 versus $22,205 for females. About 4.0% of families and 5.6% of the population were below the poverty line, including 4.6% of those under age 18 and 4.9% of those age 65 or over.

Transportation
Kanab is served by the Kanab Municipal Airport, a general aviation facility.

Jackson Flat Reservoir
In 2010, construction began on the Jackson Flat Reservoir under the direction of the Kane County Water Conservancy District. The reservoir had been in various stages of planning for 19 years. Completion of the reservoir took two years of construction, and one year of filling. The dam structure is composed of 800,000 yards of clay, dirt, and rock. The project was supervised by four engineering firms including the Utah State Engineer of Dam Safety, and the Army Corps of Engineers. The 4,228 acre-feet reservoir is an off-stream site fed by a 24-inch pipe capable of transferring 23 acre-feet of water per day. In April 2015, the reservoir reached 3,000 acre-feet of water. Water volumes vary throughout the year as reserves are tapped during summer months to supplement local irrigation needs, and are then refilled during the winter season based on annual rainfall. The reservoir is located directly south of Kanab, east of the municipal airport, and is visible from Highway 89A.

During planning and construction, crews discovered ten sites of prehistoric Anasazi ruins, including human remains. Sites which would be below the water line were fully excavated and remains turned over to the local Paiute tribe for proper care and burial ceremonies. Sites above the projected water line remain un-excavated.

The Jackson Flat Reservoir has been stocked with trout, catfish, and bluegill fish varieties. The site supports non-motorized boating, fishing and swimming.

Controversies

Natural Family Resolution
On January 10, 2006, then-mayor Kim Lawson and the city council unanimously passed Resolution 1-1-06R, titled "The Natural Family: A Vision for the City of Kanab":

"On the fifth anniversary of the Sutherland Institute it was said that 'words matter'. They have to be followed by deeds, and you have to be prepared to communicate them clearly, vividly, simply, and with repetition that is unending. Today there are large waves coming towards us in all directions, the most serious is the denigration of the natural family as the fundamental unit of society. It has been determined that the natural family results in healthier, happier, more productive, and more civically-engaged adults as well as healthier, happier, safer, and better educated children. We envision a local culture that upholds the marriage of a woman to a man, and a man to a woman, as ordained of God. This culture affirms marriage as the best path to health, security, fulfillment, and joy. It casts the home built on marriage as the source of true political sovereignty and ordered liberty. We envision parents as the first educators of their children."

The nonbinding resolution was formulated by the Sutherland Institute, a conservative advocacy group in Salt Lake City. The symbolic resolution created controversy within the city. Hundreds of tourists canceled trips to Kanab after learning about the resolution.

In Arthur Frommer's monthly travel column, Frommer called the city "homophobic" and urged readers to boycott the city.

A local civic group, the Kanab Boosters, published an open letter to ask Frommer to reconsider his boycott, making it clear that "only a small number of people agree with our city council regarding the Natural Family Proclamation." The Boosters also designed and provided stickers for citizens and resident business owners opposed to the resolution. The stickers featured a string of rainbow-colored human figures underneath the red rocks of Kanab and the words "Everyone welcome here".

In response to the criticism of the resolution, the Sutherland Institute clarified, saying that the resolution said that children are reared properly when a mother is home a significant amount of time and that a gay relationship is not a natural family.

Bikini ban
In June 2008, Kanab's city council voted to prohibit the wearing of bikinis and men's swim briefs at the city's new swimming  pool. The ban was rescinded within a month.

Search for Montezuma's treasure
In 1914 Freddy Crystal arrived in Kanab saying that, while researching in Mexico, he had discovered that the great treasure of Montezuma, spirited away by the king's men before he died, was to be found in the mountains around the town. Many searches and digs by Crystal and those who followed him ended when a plan to drain a lake, in the belief that the treasure resided in an under-water cave, was stopped by the government, because it was one of the few refuges of the Kanab ambersnail.

Kanab ambersnail
Three Lakes, a privately owned wet meadow near Kanab, is one of only two natural habitats for the Kanab ambersnail, a snail species that was listed as endangered in 1992 by the U.S. Fish and Wildlife Service and as a species of conservation priority for the Arizona Game and Fish Department.

Notable people
 LaVoy Finicum – born here
 Jacob Hamblin
 Levi Stewart
 William Thomas Stewart
 Kelly Sweet
 Mary Elizabeth Woolley

See also

 List of cities and towns in Utah
 Buckskin Gulch
 Coyote Buttes
 Paria Canyon-Vermilion Cliffs Wilderness
 The Wave (Arizona)
 Wire Pass Trailhead

References

External links

 Official website
 Kanab Chamber of Commerce
 Kane County Office of Tourism
 History of Kanab

 
Cities in Utah
Cities in Kane County, Utah
County seats in Utah
Populated places established in 1870
1870 establishments in Utah Territory